The Saint Therapon church of Mytilene, Lesbos, Greece is a church located at the port of the town dedicated to Saint Therapon.

The erection commenced in the beginning of the 19th century and was completed in 1935. The architect was the native of the island Argyris Adalis, a student of Ernst Ziller. The architectural order follows the cross-in-square type; however, the monument constitutes a combination of elements from contemporary architectural trends that prevailed in the Western Europe (Baroque, Rococo, Neoclassicism etc.). Gothic elements are prevalent as well, adding an impressiveness and a distinctive style to the monument.

Sources
Description of the church

External links

Buildings and structures in Mytilene
Baroque Revival architecture in Greece
Churches in Lesbos